The 30th Legislative Assembly of British Columbia sat from 1972 to 1975. The members were elected in the British Columbia general election held in August 1972. The New Democratic Party (NDP) led by Dave Barrett formed the government. The Social Credit Party led by W. A. C. Bennett formed the official opposition. Bill Bennett was elected Social Credit party leader in November 1973 after his father resigned his seat in the assembly in June 1973.

Gordon Dowding served as speaker for the assembly.

Members of the 30th General Assembly 
The following members were elected to the assembly in 1972:

Notes:

Party standings

By-elections 
By-elections were held to replace members for various reasons:

Notes:

Other changes 
Hugh Austin Curtis joins Social Credit October 25, 1974.
Patrick McGeer and Louis Allan Williams become Independents on May 9, 1975. They are followed by Garde Gardom on May 20. On September 30 all three join Social Credit.
Cowichan-Malahat (res. Robert Strachan October 5, 1975)

References 

Political history of British Columbia
Terms of British Columbia Parliaments
1972 establishments in British Columbia
1975 disestablishments in British Columbia
20th century in British Columbia